Ropes & Gray LLP is a global law firm with 13 offices located in the United States, Asia and Europe. The firm has more than 1,500 lawyers and professionals worldwide, and its clients include corporations and financial institutions, government agencies, universities, and health care organizations. It was founded in 1865 in Boston, Massachusetts by John Codman Ropes and John Chipman Gray.

According to the 2021 Vault Rankings, the firm ranks #3 in the best law firms to work for and The American Lawyer's Am Law 100 ranked the firm #6 in revenue and profits per equity partner in 2020. Forbes describes the firm as being recognized internationally for its fintech and global M&A work.

The firm's major practice areas include private equity, mergers & acquisitions, intellectual property, complex business litigation, securities litigation, health care, life sciences, bankruptcy and business restructuring, government enforcement and white collar crime, privacy & data security, investment management, hedge funds, antitrust, employee benefits, tax, and real estate. The firm is active in several industries, including private equity, life sciences, health care, asset management, TMT (technology, media & telecommunications) and retail.

History
The firm was founded in 1865 by two Harvard Law School graduates, John Codman Ropes and John Chipman Gray. In 1878, William Loring, also a Harvard graduate, joined the firm, and it became "Ropes, Gray and Loring" until Loring's departure in 1899, when he was appointed to the Massachusetts Supreme Judicial Court. During that period, the firm represented the New York and New England Railroad.

In 2003, the firm acquired New York City-based  private equity law firm Reboul, MacMurray, Hewitt & Maynard. In 2005, the firm acquired New York-based intellectual property law firm Fish & Neave.

Operations

Ropes and Gray has offices in Boston, Chicago, Dublin, Hong Kong, London, Los Angeles, New York, San Francisco, Seoul, Shanghai, Silicon Valley, Tokyo and Washington, D.C. The firm's Boston office is located in the Prudential Tower and is the global headquarters of the firm. The firm's New York office is located at 1211 Avenue of the Americas.

Prominent transactions 

Ropes & Gray lawyers have advised on major transactions, including:
 Altimeter Growth Corp. in its merger to take Grab public for $39.6 billion, the largest special-purpose acquisition company merger in history
 The acquisition by private equity firms Thomas H. Lee and Bain Capital of Clear Channel Communications, for $26 billion
 Bain Capital's and The Blackstone Group's acquisition of The Weather Channel, in a multibillion-dollar deal
 The sale of the Warner Music Group to Access Industries by private equity firms Bain Capital and Thomas H. Lee, for $3.3 billion
 Genzyme's acquisition by Sanofi-Aventis, for $20.1 billion
 NSTAR's merger with Northeast Utilities, for $7.1 billion
 China Everbright's acquisition of Focus Media, for $3.7 billion
 TPG Capital's acquisition of J.Crew, for $3 billion
 A private equity group's acquisition of Dunkin' Donuts, for $2.4 billion
 Berkshire Partners acquisition of Lightower Fiber Networks and Sidera Networks, for $2 billion
 The Bare Escentuals merger with Shiseido of Japan, a $1.7 billion deal
 Bain Capital's acquisition of MYOB, Australia's largest financial software developer;
 Bain Capital’s acquisition of Bellsystem24 
 TPG Capital and the Canadian Pension Plan Investment Board’s $5.2 billion acquisition of IMS Health Inc., a provider of market intelligence to the pharmaceutical and health care industries
 Genzyme Corporation’s $2.9 billion deal with Bayer Schering Pharma AG that expanded Genzyme's oncology portfolio by giving the company rights to marketed cancer drugs and control of a program in multiple sclerosis. The transaction was recognized as a "Deal of Distinction" by the Licensing Executives Society in September 2010
 Bain Capital’s 2018 sale by Toshiba Corp. of its semiconductor business to a group that included Apple, Seagate, Kingston, Hoya, Dell Technologies and SK Hynix. The transaction was Asia’s largest leveraged buyout and private equity deal ever, and was valued at approximately $18 billion

Prominent cases 
Ropes & Gray lawyers have litigated high-profile cases, including:

 Defending physicians’ First Amendment rights in Wollschlaeger v. Governor of Florida. The case concerned a Florida law banning doctors from inquiring about patients’ gun ownership.
 Representing Gawker in its Chapter 11 filing.
 Leading a 10-month independent investigation for the U.S. Olympic Committee into sexual abuses by former USA Gymnastics national team doctor Larry Nassar.
 Representing Willkie Farr & Gallagher (then) co-chairman Gordon Caplan, JD, who was arrested in March 2019 as a parent participant in the 2019 college admissions bribery scandal. Caplan is represented by firm partners Joshua Levy, co-chairman of global litigation and enforcement practice, and Michael McGovern, co-chairman of government enforcement practice. A guilty plea deal in United States v. Gordon Caplan was filed by United States Attorney Andrew Lelling on March 27, 2019. An Assistant United States Attorney prosecuting the case, Leslie Wright, is a Ropes & Gray alumna.
 Representing Harris Associates in a seminal case for the mutual funds industry. In March 2010, the Supreme Court ruled in Jones v. Harris Associates, which definitively established the standard governing claims of excessive mutual fund fees under § 36(b) of the Investment Company Act of 1940.
 Defending former BP engineer Kurt Mix against obstruction of justice charges related to the BP Deepwater Horizon oil spill.

Public Service 

Ropes & Gray attorneys provide public service in the form of pro bono legal work, community service and charitable donations. Notable pro bono cases include:

 The Supreme Court marriage equality case Obergefell v. Hodges.
 Nunez v. City of New York, a lawsuit seeking to end inmate abuse at Rikers Island in New York City.
 Exonerating John Huffington, who was imprisoned for 32 years for a 1981 double murder that he did not commit, in State of Maryland v. Huffington.

Diversity and inclusion 

 The firm’s Roscoe Trimmier Jr. Diversity Scholarship offers $25,000 and a summer associate position to second-year law students who are members of populations historically underrepresented in the legal profession.

Awards 
 Received five Law360 “Practice Group of the Year” awards for private equity, fund formation, securitizations, health care and white collar in 2019.

Miscellaneous
In late 2010, the firm's Boston office moved to the top office floors of the Prudential Tower in the Back Bay neighborhood.

Notable current and former attorneys
Eleanor D. Acheson (Associate 1974-1983, Partner, 1983-1993) – Vice president and general counsel of Amtrak. Former Assistant Attorney General of the United States.
Michael P. Allen – judge of the United States Court of Appeals for Veterans Claims
Mark Barnes (Partner) – Activist and academic, former Chief Research Compliance Officer, Harvard University.
 Marta Belcher (Attorney) – Pioneer in the area of blockchain law.
Yochai Benkler (Associate, 1994-1995) – Jack N. and Lillian R. Berkman Professor for Entrepreneurial Legal Studies, Harvard Law School.
Janis M. Berry (Partner, 1986-1997) – Associate Justice of the Massachusetts Appeals Court.
Eric Bjornlund – co-founder of Democracy International
Stephen L. Braga (former Partner) – Criminal defense attorney known for his successful pro bono representation of Martin Tankleff.
Levin H. Campbell – Judge of the United States Court of Appeals for the First Circuit.
Jennifer Choe-Groves – judge of the United States Court of International Trade 
Robert C. Clark (Associate, 1972-1974) – Former Dean of the Faculty of Law (1989-2003), and Harvard University Distinguished Service Professor (2003–present), Harvard University. 
Archibald Cox (Associate, 1938-1945) – U.S. Solicitor General under President  John F. Kennedy; first special prosecutor for the Watergate scandal. 
Lee M. Friedman (Associate, 1895-1897) – lawyer and historian 
George S. Hawkins – General Manager of the DC Water and Sewer Authority.
Olin M. Jeffords – (Associate, 1919-1921) – Chief Justice of the Vermont Supreme Court, 
Henry Cabot Lodge – (Associate, 1875-1880) – American statesman and 1st U.S. Senate Majority Leader.
George H. Lyman (Associate) – chairman of the Massachusetts Republican state committee and collector of customs for the port of Boston.
R. Bradford Malt (Chairman, 2004–2019) – Served as sole trustee of the Romney blind trusts during Mitt Romney’s tenure as governor of Massachusetts and during his two presidential runs. 
Diane Bemus Patrick (Partner) – Former First Lady of Massachusetts.
John Palfrey (Associate, 2001-2002) – President of the John D. and Catherine T. MacArthur Foundation.
Elliot Richardson (Associate, 1949-1953, 1955-1957; Partner, 1961-1965) – Former U.S. Secretary of Health, Education and Welfare (1970-1973); U.S. Secretary of Defense (1973); U.S. Attorney General (1973); United States Ambassador to the United Kingdom (1975-1976); and U.S. Secretary of Commerce (1976-1977).
John Richardson (1911–1970s) – Specialized in corporate and trustee work and was responsible for hiring young lawyers to join the firm. Political supporter of Herbert Hoover and Republican National Committeeman from Massachusetts from 1932 to 1936.
Charles Soule – comic book writer for Marvel Comics
Clayton Spencer (Partner, 1986-1989) – president of Bates College
Christopher Taylor (Associate) Mayor of Ann Arbor since 2014.
James Vorenberg (Associate, 1954 – 1960; Partner, 1960-1962) – Former Dean of the Faculty of Law, Harvard University (1981-1989).
Jane Willis (Partner) - Part of the MIT Blackjack Team later fictionalized in Bringing Down the House.

See also
List of largest United States-based law firms by profits per partner
White-shoe firms

References

External links
 
 2011 American Lawyer A-List

Intellectual property law firms
Biopharmaceutical law firms
Law firms established in 1865
Law firms based in Boston
Foreign law firms with offices in Japan